David Charles Purley, GM (26 January 1945 – 2 July 1985) was a British racing driver born in Bognor Regis, West Sussex, who participated in 11 Formula One World Championship Grands Prix, debuting at Monaco in 1973.

Purley is best known for his actions at the 1973 Dutch Grand Prix, where he abandoned his own race and attempted to save the life of fellow driver Roger Williamson, whose car was upside down and on fire following a serious accident. Purley was awarded the George Medal for his courage in trying to save Williamson, who suffocated in the blaze.

During pre-qualifying for the 1977 British Grand Prix Purley sustained multiple bone fractures after his car's throttle stuck open and he crashed into a wall. His deceleration from 108 mph (173 km/h) to 0 in a distance of 26 inches (66 cm) is one of the highest G-loads survived in a crash (180 G). He scored no championship points during his Formula One career. He died in a plane crash, having retired from motorsport and taken up aerobatics, in 1985.

Early life
Purley's father was Charles Purley, the founder of LEC Refrigeration. Birth and death records show that his father's name was originally Puxley but he preferred the name Purley. His mother was Welsh, having been born in the small village of Cwmfelinfach. David went to school at Seaford College and then Dartington Hall School in Devon.

Career
Purley joined the British Army and was an Officer Cadet at Sandhurst on Intake 38. Commissioned into the Parachute Regiment, he lost the first of his nine lives when his parachute failed to open on a training jump. Miraculously, he landed on his Platoon Sergeant's 'chute and both survived the heavy landing. Having seen action with his Battalion in Aden, he left the Army to pursue a career in motor racing.

He later raced in various series with an AC Cobra and a Chevron, before racing in Formula Three, winning three times at Chimay between 1970 and 1972.

In 1972 Purley was one of two drivers to attempt to race the Connew Grand Prix car in its original Formula One configuration. He was entered at the end of season World Championship Victory Race at Brands Hatch but did not start. Purley had asked for an electrical "kill" switch to be fitted to the steering wheel, but this malfunctioned on the warm up lap, the engine stopped, and the car was retired.

In 1973 Purley hired a March and with backing from his family's refrigeration company he made an attempt at Formula One.

At the 1973 Dutch Grand Prix, upon witnessing a crash which left fellow British driver Roger Williamson trapped in his overturned and burning car, Purley abandoned his own race and attempted to save Williamson, who was participating in only his second Formula One race. Purley later recalled that upon arriving at the scene, he heard Williamson crying for help as the fire began to take hold. Purley's efforts to right the car and extinguish the flames were in vain as he received no help from nearby track marshals or emergency workers, in spite of attempts to encourage them, and other passing drivers, to come to his aid; Williamson died from asphyxiation. The marshals were not wearing fire resistant clothing and the passing drivers assumed that Purley was attempting to extinguish his own car, having escaped a fiery crash unharmed.

A sequence of pictures taken by photographer Cor Mooij of the accident won the Photo Sequences category of that year's World Press Photo. Later, Purley was awarded the George Medal for his rescue attempt. The story, and film footage of the rescue attempt, feature in a 2010 BBC documentary titled Grand Prix: The Killer Years.

Apart from a one-off participation with Token at his home Grand Prix in 1974, Purley stayed out of Formula One for a few years, preferring to compete in Formula Two driving Chevrons and Marches for Hong Kong-based millionaire Bob Harper, and Formula 5000 where he won the British Championship in 1976 in a Chevron powered by the Cosworth GA 3.4-litre V6 engine.
In 1974 Purley won the Brighton Speed Trials driving a Trojan-Chevrolet T101, winning again the following year in a Chevron-GA B30.

He returned to Formula One in 1977 with his own LEC chassis designed by Mike Pilbeam and run by Mike Earle. It was this car in which he suffered serious injuries in an accident during practice for that year's British Grand Prix. He survived an estimated 179.8 g when he decelerated from 108 mph (173 km/h) to 0 in a distance of 26 inches (66 cm) after his throttle became stuck wide open and he hit a wall. This was the highest measured g-force ever survived by a human being until 2003 (when Kenny Bräck's crash violence recording system measured 214 g). Purley suffered multiple fractures to his legs, pelvis and ribs.

Purley recovered to race again, although he confined his activities to the minor Aurora AFX series of Formula One races in Britain. As a result of his earlier accident, Purley's left leg was shorter than his right and he underwent innovative corrective surgery in Belgium, from which he again took several months to recover.

Following his decision to quit motorsport, Purley moved into competition aerobatics.

Death
Purley died on 2 July 1985 when his Pitts Special aerobatic biplane crashed into the English Channel off Bognor Regis. He is buried in the churchyard of St. Nicholas Church, West Itchenor, near Chichester.

Legacy
The remains of Purley's crashed LEC CRP1 and its replacement were displayed at the Donington Grand Prix Exhibition until 2011. The second car has since been restored and now competes in historic Formula One racing, alongside a replica car built more recently.

  A David Purley memorial, in the form of a sculpture by the British artist Gordon Young, was erected in 2017 close to the site of the former LEC factory in Bognor Regis. It is inscribed with the words that appear on the headstone of his grave at Itchenor: "Gone now your eager smile, high held head and soldier's stride, etched were skies by your elegant style, and this earth enriched by your pride".

Racing record

Complete European Formula Two Championship results
(key)

Complete Formula One World Championship results
(key)

Complete Formula One Non-Championship results
(key)

Complete European F5000 Championship results
(key) (Races in bold indicate pole position; races in italics indicate fastest lap.)

Complete Shellsport International Series results
(key) (Races in bold indicate pole position; races in italics indicate fastest lap.)

Complete British Formula One Championship results
(key)

References

Books

External links
 

People educated at Seaford College
Recipients of the George Medal
English racing drivers
English Formula One drivers
European Formula Two Championship drivers
Brighton Speed Trials people
Military personnel from Sussex
British Parachute Regiment officers
British military personnel of the Aden Emergency
People from Bognor Regis
1945 births
1985 deaths
LEC Refrigeration Racing Formula One drivers
Token Formula One drivers
British Formula One Championship drivers
World Sportscar Championship drivers
People educated at Dartington Hall School
Formula One team owners